The Mediaeval Stone Building is an unidentified mediaeval ruin on Much Park Street, Coventry, in the West Midlands of England. The ruin is a Grade II* listed building. The building is believed to have been built in the late 13th or early 14th century and was uncovered by a German bomb during the Coventry Blitz. The building was originally rectangular, and is made from red sandstone and one of the walls contains a single pointed arched window in one wall. The shell of the cellar remains—one of several similar cellars in Coventry city centre including those at 21–22 High Street, Coventry and 38–39 Bayley Lane—as do three of the four walls from the ground floor. However, the vault has been lost.

The building's original purpose is unknown. There is speculation that it may have been associated with the monastery at Whitefriars further along Much Park Street or an independent merchant's house. The site of the building was excavated in 1971, and archaeologists discovered pottery from the 13th and 14th centuries.

References

Buildings and structures completed in the 14th century
Grade II* listed buildings in the West Midlands (county)
Buildings and structures in Coventry
Grade II* listed ruins